Miss Nigeria is an annual pageant showcasing positive attributes of Nigerian women and awarding university scholarships. The winner portrays exemplary qualities and serves as a role model for young women in the country. The pageant is currently organised by Daily Times.

The current titleholder is 18-year-old hijab model Shatu Garko who represented the north-east. She is the first Muslim winner in the pageant's 64-year history, and the first hijabi alongside pharmacist Halima Abubakar.

History
National newspaper Daily Times established the Miss Nigeria franchise which originally started as a photo contest in 1957. Contestants sent photographs to the publication's Lagos office where finalists were shortlisted; those successful were invited to compete in the live final which at the time did not include a swimsuit competition at the Lagos Island Club. UAC employee Grace Oyelude won the maiden edition of Miss Nigeria, and would later use part of her £200 prize money to travel to England where she studied Nursing.

Contrary to popular belief, Julie Coker was not the first Miss Nigeria – the school teacher had actually won Miss Western Nigeria. However, she did compete in the contest the year after Oyelude's reign, but lost to office clerk Helen Anyamaeluna. Former seamstress Nene Etule remains the only non-Nigerian to have won the contest; she was eligible as the Southern Cameroons were under Nigerian constitution in 1959. The following year the contest was briefly renamed 'Miss Independence' to commemorate the country's independence from British rule, and WNTV continuity announcer Rosemary Anieze was crowned in a ceremony which included Coker as one of the judges.

After the new millennium, Miss Nigeria became a shadow of its former self, and the contest was placed on hold in 2004. Prior to this, no winner was crowned after Clara Ojo's victory from 1994 to 1998 due to the organiser's incapability to convene a pageant during this time. To date, Ojo remains the longest-serving Miss Nigeria (Although no contest was held from 2004 to 2010, Ene Lawani had already ceased ceremonial duties long before the franchise was purchased from the Daily Times. Similarly, no winner was crowned for seven years after Stella Owivri until the pageant was revamped in 1977 when reigning Miss World Cindy Breakspeare crowned Toyin Monney).

In 2010, after a six-year attempt, AOE Events and Entertainment, headed by former MBGN Nike Oshinowo were brought into the Miss Nigeria franchise by Daily Times. For the first time in its history, entry was open to women in the diaspora, and inspired by Miss America, Oshinowo relaunched Miss Nigeria as a scholarship programme which offered free tuition to first, second, and third-place winners, with the Miss Nigeria titleholder receiving a scholarship to study at any university worldwide. The new Miss Nigeria now included a reality show The Making of a Queen which saw contestants compete in various tasks synonymous with Nigerian women including cooking on outdoor firewood stoves, hostessing, and haggling with market traders, with a number of contestants facing eviction each week. Evening gowns were made from traditional African fabrics and, most notably, the swimsuit competition was discontinued. The pageant ran for two years before the organisation of the pageant was taken over by Beth Model Management CEO and former Miss Nigeria UK, Elizabeth Elohor Isiorho in 2012. Elizabeth stopped organising the pageant in 2014.

In 2016 Miss Nigeria established the Green Girl Project, a community development initiative aimed at empowering young women to become facilitators of sustainable practices towards ensuring a clean and peaceful environment. It also aims to give young women a platform to become agents of change for the environment.

International level
In 1963, Miss Nigeria 1962 Yemi Idowu became the first winner to represent the country at Miss United Nations where she reached the semi-final. The following year, salesgirl Edna Park became the only Miss Nigeria at Miss Universe, but is best remembered for disrupting the evening when she collapsed on stage after failing to reach the top fifteen. She was carried away by policemen and contest officials, and spent the night in a Miami hospital under sedation where she was consoled by Nneka Onyegbula, wife of the Nigerian ambassador, who reportedly stated "All the judges are white, and they aren't really competent to judge dark girls' beauty". Since Park, no other Miss Nigeria has competed at Miss Universe, although the country returned to the international stage when Art student Rosaline Balogun became the first official Miss Nigeria at Miss World in 1967. No pageant was held in 1969, yet London-based secretary Morenike Faribido (née Coker) was handpicked to use the "Miss Nigeria" title and represent the country at Miss World.

Several Miss Nigeria winners were expected to compete at Miss World but never attended due to lack of sponsors, including Syster Jack (1980), Rita Martins (1983), and Rita Anuku (1986). Schoolteacher Rosemary Okeke (1985) was the last Miss Nigeria at Miss World, while Law student Nwando Okwuosa (2003) was the last to compete internationally at Miss International.

With the gradual demise of Daily Times and rivalry with Sliverbird's Most Beautiful Girl in Nigeria, Daily Times lost their license to send delegates to Miss World and Miss Universe.

Competition
Contestants are required to be unmarried, childless, and not pregnant, with a good command of English, and of Nigerian citizenship. They should be between the ages of 18 and 25 years old, of good health, and of good character with no tattoos or piercings apart from ears.

The competition starts with a call to entry where interested participants acquire registration forms before screening exercises commence. Judges select a number of contestants for orientation camp lasting a total of 2–3 weeks where contestants are given tasks to test their skills in different areas. They are also given training in various activities to empower them, develop their entrepreneurship skills, and expose them to different industries enabling them to understand and begin to learn the role of an ambassador. Originally, contestants were given numbers during live shows, but this was changed in 2010 when they each represented Nigerian states. For the 2013 edition, they represented their respective individuality – each contestant had their name printed on their sash, and only twenty-one of the thirty-six semi-finalists competed in the final. In 2015, the contestants once again represented states.

Prizes for the winner vary each year; as of 2013 this includes ₦3,000,000, a luxury car, the Miss Nigeria diamond-encrusted crown, an apartment for the duration of the winner's reign, and a modeling contract with Beth Model Management. The full scholarship now extends to higher institutions in the country only. Throughout the year, the winner is sponsored by several prestigious organisations, and may land endorsement deals.

Criticism
Former pageant manager Yomi Onanuga told an interviewer in 2006: "We are tired of seeing girls on stage after two weeks in camp, and having much fun, all we see is that they ask them [questions] and they win. Two months after, somebody asks her the same question, she cannot answer, and people begin to ask, Where did she get her crown from?". English Literature student Ibinabo Fiberesima was unable to name the vice-chancellor of the University of Ibadan which she attended. She has claimed in numerous interviews and on her former website that she had competed in 1997, but this statement is questionable as no contest was held that year; Clara Ojo held the title from 1994 to 1998 when she crowned her successor Regina Nwanubar. Fiberesima had actually competed in 1991, finishing second behind Bibiana Ohio.

In 1988, dark-skinned trainee caterer Stella Okoye crowned her successor Wunmi Adebowale who was also dark, thus breaking a long line of light-skinned winners, yet Okoye's reign had not been without controversy. Fellow contestant Omasan Buwa told The Punch in 2011 "There was a big uproar and they had to take her out with police escort[s]. The audience felt she was very dark."

The mediocre prizes, along with the lack of endorsements and connections, were a cause for concern before the new millennium. Alice Ad'epe, who won in 1963, told the Idoma Voice "After my reign, that was end of the story. There was no follow up, nobody cared to know how I was faring. Things were no longer rosy. I was abandoned, so I decided to return home." 1993 winner Janet Fateye stated "People thought I was raking in all the money there was, but that wasn't the case. The prize money at the time was a mere N12,000, given to me at N1,000 a month. Yes, I got the car prize that was being serviced by Daily Times, but then I had to buy petrol!" Millennium queen Vien Tetsola reportedly resided in accommodation hardly matching her status as reigning Miss Nigeria.

For the first time in the pageant's history, 18-year-old Shatu Garko became the first practising Muslim to win the title, but her victory was met with opposition from Hisbah, a Muslim purist group in Northern Nigeria. Hisbah criticised Garko's participation in the pageant, claiming it was against Islam, and her action potentially served as an inspiration for other ladies to imitate her actions. In an interview with BBC Hausa, Kano state Hisbah board chairman, Muhammad Harun Ibn-Sina, stated pageantry was against the teaching of Islam, and her parents would be invited to a meeting with the Hisbah board to remind them of their responsibilities and Islamic injunctions.

Scandals
Toyin Monney, a single mother who withheld information regarding her actual age (She was said to be 32), was banned from competing at Miss World, leaving no time to process a visa for Miss Nigeria's second-place winner. Miss Nigeria 1981 Tokunboh Onanuga was accused of forging the WAEC certificate she used to gain admission into the University of Lagos, and was subsequently expelled by the institution; in 2011, WAEC confirmed on their Twitter account that Onanuga had committed fraud.

Binta Sukai's eligibility to compete in 1990 was questioned when she was rumoured to be non-Nigerian. It was later confirmed the aspiring fashion designer was only one-quarters Scottish.

In 2001, City People revealed the reigning Miss Nigeria, thirty-year-old Valerie Peterside, had lied about her actual age (She had told organisers she was twenty-five) and forged her university qualifications (She was reportedly expelled from Ahmadu Bello University before graduation due to examination malpractice). Following an investigation by several prominent Nigerians including former Daily Times editor Tony Momoh and former Miss Nigeria contestant Julie Coker, a decision was made to dethrone her. Peterside, who had competed the previous year (Again as a 25-year-old), fought to keep the crown, but was forced to resign, allowing first runner-up Applied Chemistry student Amina Ekpo to take over.

Despite her popularity as Miss Nigeria 2002, International relations graduate Sylvia Edem attracted further media attention when it was rumoured she had forged her date of birth to compete, like Peterside before her. It was believed that Edem was thirty years old, until an investigation confirmed she was indeed twenty-three.

Titleholders

{| class="wikitable"
|-
! Year
! Title Holder
! Region/State of origin* 
! Notes
|-
! 1957
| Grace Atinuke Oyelude
| Northern Region 
| Now retired from nursing
|-
! 1958
| Helen Anyamaeluna †
| Mid-West Region
| 
|-
! 1959
| Nene Etule
|Victoria (Non-Nigerian)
| Now Nene Malafa; married former Director of United Nations Information Services in Nigeria, Pen Malafa;
|-
! 1960
| Rosemary Nkem Anieze also known as "Miss Independence"
| Mid-West Region
| Now Rosemary Anieze-Adams, worked in TV and radio
|-
! 1961
| Clara Ifeoma Emefiena
| Mid-West Region
|
|-
! 1962
| Yemi Idowu†
| Western Region
| Later Yemi Majekodunmi; was semi-finalist at Miss United Nations 
|-
! 1963
| Alice Alache Akla Ad'epe
| Northern Nigeria
| First Idoma winner
|-
! 1964
| Edna Park
| Mid-West Nigeria
| First Nigerian at Miss Universe
|-
! 1965
| Anna Eboweime
| Mid-West Nigeria
| 
|-
! 1967
| Rosaline Yinka Balogun
| Western State
| First official Miss Nigeria at Miss World|-
! 1968
| Foluke Abosede Ogundipe†
| Western State
| 
|-
! 1970
|Stella Owivri † Also known as "Miss New Nigeria"| Mid-Western State
| 
|-
! 1977
| Toyin Monney
| Lagos
| Oldest winner (32)|-
! 1978
| Irene Omagbemi
| Lagos
|
|-
! 1979
| Helen Prest
| Bendel
| Later Helen Prest-Davis and now Helen Prest-Ajayi; lawyer, author and columnist|-
! 1980
| Syster Jack
| Rivers
| 
|-
! 1981
| Tokunbo Onanuga dethroned| Lagos
| Dethroned after false WAEC results were discovered|-
! 1982
| Rita Baraleye Martins resigned| Rivers
|
|-
! 1984
| Cynthia Oronsaye
| Bendel
|
|-
! 1985
| Rosemary Nkemdilim Okeke
| Imo
| Later Rosemary Wright; last Miss Nigeria at Miss World, now fashion designer|-
! 1986
| Rita Anuku †
| Bendel
| 
|-
! 1987
| Stella Okoye
| Imo
| 
|-
! 1988
| Adewunmi Adebowale
| Lagos
| Now Wunmi Ogunbiyi; manager with Zenith Bank|-
! 1990
| Binta Sukai
| Kaduna
| 
|-
! 1991
| Bibiana Ohio-Esezeoboh
| Bendel
| Former actress, now real estate agent and voice artist|-
! 1993
| Janet Olukemi Fateye
| Lagos
| Now Janet Gabriel; IT consultant|-
! 1994
| Clara Nosakhare Ojo
| Edo
| Longest-serving Miss Nigeria; now Pastor Clara Kolawole|-
! 1998
| Regina Nwabunar
| Abia
|
|-
! 2000
| Vien Bemigho Tetsola also known as the "Millennium Queen"| Delta
| Now known as Israel Shepherd; pastor|-
! 2001 a| Valerie Ama Peterside dethroned| Rivers
| Dethroned for forging age and qualifications|-
! 2001 b| Amina Eyo Ekpo  replaced Peterside| Akwa Ibom
| Now applied chemist|-
!2002
|Sylvia Ansa Edem
| Cross River
| First South-South winner; now Sylvia Emechete, businesswoman|-
! 2003
| Nwando Okwuosa
| Anambra
| Last Miss Nigeria to compete at international level|-
! 2004
| Ene Maya Lawani
| Benue
| Now fashion designer specializing in headgear|-
! 2010
|Oluwadamilola Agbajor
| Delta
|
|-
!2011
|Oluwafeyijimi Modupeola Sodipo
| Ogun
|
|-
!2013
|Ezinne Akudo Anyaoha
| Imo
|Now lawyer and activist|-
!2015
|Pamela Lessi Peter-Vigboro
|Rivers
|First Ogoni winner; now professional photographer|-
!2016
|Chioma Stephanie Obiadi
| Anambra
| Previously Miss Earth Nigeria 2016|-
!2017
|Mildred Peace Ehiguese
| Adamawa
| First North-Eastern winner|-
!2018
|Chidinma Leilani Aaron
|Enugu
|
|-
!2019
|Beauty Etsanyi Tukura
|Taraba
|First winner from Taraba State|-
!2021
|Shatu Sani Garko
|Kano
|First Muslim winner|-
|}

 Denotes Region/state of origin during time of coronation

Notable contestants
 Mbong Odungide (2004) - Most Beautiful Girl in Akwa Ibom 2003 and actress
 Isabella Ayuk (2004) – MBGN 2011
Damilola Bolarinde (2017) - TNQ 2022
Omasan Buwa (1987) – MBGN 1987
 Queen Celestine (2013) - Chef and MBGN Universe 2014
 Cynthia Umezulike (2004) – Model, lawyer, and Miss Commonwealth Nigeria 2010
Chika Chikezie (1998) - MBGN 1998
 Julie Coker (1958) – Newsreader and TV presenter
 Ufuoma Ejenobor (2004) – Actress
Maryam Elisha (2010 and 2013) – Fashion designer 
 Joan Elumelu (1981) – Founder, Nigeria's Next Supermodel 
Linda Ikeji (2003) - Model and blogger
Susan Hart (1993) - Businesswoman and MBGN 1994
Sylvia Nduka (2010) – Lawyer and MBGN 2011Controversies Still Trailing Sylvia Nduka
 Chikaodili Nna-Udosen (2019) – TNQ 2020
 Nowe Isibor (2011) – Creative Director/Founder Mosé – The Mosé Store

Notes:
  † Now deceased 

Unofficial title holders
 Former Miss Western Nigeria Julie Coker is often described as the first Miss Nigeria winner, but she actually won Miss Western Nigeria.
In 1963, although Miss Nigeria had already crowned the first ever Idoma winner Alice Ad'epe, a different pageant, Miss Nigeria World, was organised to select a Miss World delegate. 16-year-old Martha Bassey emerged winner despite reservations from the judges who described the contestants as "too ugly", but Miss World organisers disqualified her on age grounds. Eric Morley had confirmed no suitable Nigerian representative had been selected, but first runner-up Gina Onyejiaka became the first ever Nigerian delegate after flying to London at her own expense (Miss World organisers Mecca Dancing refused to pay for her flight to avoid accusations of favouritism). Although Miss World accepted her as a contestant, the Nigerian High Commission refused to acknowledge Onyejiaka.
 In 1966, after Miss Nigeria failed to send a representative to Miss World (No contest was held in Lagos that year), London-resident Uzor Okafor was disqualified after the deputy Nigerian High Commissioner, Latif Dosumu, refused to sign her registration form as required by the Miss World Organisation, claiming the High Commission did not endorse pageants and were therefore unable to lend official support. Okafor had described her participation as a gesture of goodwill, and argued the High Commission had assured her she could register as an official candidate, but Dosumu denied the claim. Okafor, who had given birth to one of her two daughters seven months prior, was ordered to leave the competition immediately (Married women were allowed to compete in Miss World before the early 70s). Okafor later stated she regretted her involvement with the pageant, and revealed she had been urged to compete by her British husband Bruce Newman.
No competition was held in 1969 due to the Nigerian Civil War, but Morenike Faridibo was selected as an unofficial Miss Nigeria in a ceremony held in London.
Shortly after Agbani Darego's victory at Miss World, Miss Nigeria 2001 Amina Ekpo took legal action against her MBGN counterpart, accusing Darego of misrepresentation and fraudulently presenting herself as "Miss Nigeria" at the international pageant without authorisation (At international level, MBGN representatives were billed as "Miss Nigeria"). Former Daily Times managing director Onukaba Adinoyi Ojo, who had famously described MBGN winners as "lowly-rated queens" supported the $10,000,000 lawsuit, stating "We will do everything possible to make sure we prevent people from tampering with a patented pageant like Miss Nigeria, [and] will not allow anybody to misrepresent us."
 The Guardian came under fire for misrepresenting the Miss Nigeria brand in 2011 when Theatre Arts student and former MBGN runner-up Sandra Otohwo was billed as "Miss Nigeria 2009" by their sister publication Allure. Otohwo, who had represented Nigeria at Miss Universe 2009, posed for photographs in a bikini which enraged the Miss Nigeria organisers who promoted their swimsuit-free pageant as a wholesome institution. They also pointed out that the competition was dormant from 2004 to 2010, therefore making it impossible for the organisers to have crowned a queen in 2009. The Guardian later apologised and printed the organisers' letter in a subsequent issue.

Difference between Miss Nigeria and MBGN
The Most Beautiful Girl in Nigeria (MBGN) pageant is organised by the Silverbird Group while Miss Nigeria is currently handled by Daily Times'' (Folio).  The Miss Nigeria swimsuit competition was scrapped in 2011, but this feature remains popular at MBGN. Another notable distinction is only MBGN contestants automatically become representatives at international pageants.

References

External links
 

Beauty pageants in Nigeria
History of women in Nigeria
1957 establishments in Nigeria
Nigerian awards
Recurring events established in 1957